The 56th Oregon Legislative Assembly convened for its regular session in 1971. The Democratic Party of Oregon held the majority in the Oregon State Senate, and the Oregon Republican Party held the majority in the Oregon House of Representatives. Republican Tom McCall was the Governor of Oregon.

According to a biography of McCall, the two most significant legislative efforts during the session were the Oregon Bottle Bill, which passed, and a bill to "thwart migrant farm workers' attempts to form labor unions," which McCall vetoed.

References 

1971 in Oregon
Oregon legislative sessions
1971 U.S. legislative sessions
1972 in Oregon
1972 U.S. legislative sessions